= IZM =

South Korean online magazine

- Website type: Online magazine
- Available in: Korean
- Owner: Im Jin-mo
- Creator: Im Jin-mo
- Editor: Jang Jun-hwan
- Website: izm.co.kr
- Launched: August 30, 2001; 25 years ago
- Current status: Active

IZM (Korean: 이즘; RR: Ijeum) is a South Korean online magazine that publishes pop music reviews, articles, and interviews with artists. It was founded in August 2001 by music critic Im Jin-mo and is edited by music critic Jang Jun-hwan. The name originates from the initials of its founder, and later interpreted to reflect the suffix "-ism", representing its role as a space contains thoughts about music.
